Delta Force: Xtreme 2 (DFX2) is a first-person shooter video game by NovaLogic. NovaLogic's previous title was Delta Force: Xtreme, which was released in April 2005.

Gameplay 
DFX2 has added multiplayer features, such as in-game squad emblems on characters and vehicles, and the ability to respawn in teammates' vehicles. The game comes with a MED mission editor and a number of terrains and assets for players to create their own battleground and host them online.

Development and release 
A free beta was available to the public before the full release of the game. The beta was first issued to Gold Members at NovaWorld 2. Additionally, players were able to test both single player and multiplayer content.

The game was officially released on June 2, 2009 in North America, and became available worldwide through digital download through numerous sites including the NovaWorld Store, as of 19 June the game is available for download through Steam.

Reception

References

External links
 
 Official website

Delta Force (video game series)
2009 video games
First-person shooters
Video games about Delta Force
Video games developed in the United States
Video games set in Egypt
Video games set in Laos
Video games set in Libya
Video games set in Sri Lanka
Video games set in Tajikistan
Video games set in Thailand
Video games set in Uzbekistan
Windows games
Windows-only games
NovaLogic games